Laurent Carrasco (born 6 September 1976) is a former French rugby league footballer who last played as a  for Villeneuve XIII RLLG in the Elite One Championship.

Background
Laurent Carrasco was born in Villeneuve-sur-Lot, Lot-et-Garonne, France.

Representative career
Carrasco is a French international and played at the 2000 and 2008 World Cups and on the 2001 tour to New Zealand and Papua New Guinea.

References

External links
Rinaldi to Captain France
The Teams:France

Living people
1976 births
France national rugby league team players
French rugby league players
Rugby articles needing expert attention
Rugby league locks
Spain national rugby league team players
Toulouse Olympique players
Villeneuve Leopards players